John Raven Johnson (August 9, 1900 – May 25, 1983) was an American chemist.

Johnson was notable, among other things, for the discovery of the nearly quantitative oxidation of organoboranes to alcohols by alkaline hydrogen peroxide.
Johnson was Todd Professor Emeritus of Chemistry at Cornell University, a member of the National Academy of Sciences, chair of the Cornell Department of Chemistry.

Notable works 
 1928 Laboratory Experiments in Organic Chemistry - "a widely used textbook"

Life and career 
Johnson received his Ph.D. in organic chemistry from the University of Illinois in 1922.

References 

1900 births
1983 deaths
20th-century American chemists
Members of the United States National Academy of Sciences
Cornell University faculty